Metro Transit, previously known as Metro Area Transit, is Omaha, Nebraska's local mass transportation provider. Metro currently operates around 135 buses throughout the Omaha-Council Bluffs metropolitan area, including  Bellevue, Ralston, La Vista, and Papillion in Nebraska and Council Bluffs in Iowa. Operated by the Omaha Transit Authority, a governmental subdivision of the State of Nebraska, Metro's board consists of a five-member board appointed by the mayor and confirmed by the Omaha City Council and the Douglas County Commissioners. The agency receives funds from local, state, and federal sources. The city has equipped its buses with bicycle carriers and onboard Wifi. The service hours of the entire system are generally from about 4:30 am–1:00 am on weekdays, 5:00 am-midnight on Saturdays, and 6:00 am–9:30 pm on Sundays, with many routes operating a shorter span. (Some routes operate as rush hour-only, weekday-only, or Monday-Saturday only)

History

The first board was sworn in and took office on May 30, 1972. On August 23, 2010, Metro Area Transit was rebranded as Metro.

Rebranding

In an effort to shed the stigma associated with the Metro Area Transit name, the new Metro brand was adopted on August 23, 2010.  Along with their new light blue outlined "M" logo, the message of an organization that is modern and looking to the future was conveyed.  In just a short time after the rebranding, Metro worked hard to keep good on their pledge to provide better service, and a large amount of improvements were made.

Just prior to the rebranding, 9 new 2009 Gillig low-floor buses arrived in Omaha.  Although not publicized, these buses were the first new buses in Omaha since 2000.
The first major change with the rebranding was the acquisition of 24 new 2010 Gillig low-floor buses.  These buses traveled Omaha for at least six months with no advertisements or brand due to conditions unsuitable for affixing graphics.  By the end of March, 2011, all of Metro's fleet sported the Metro logo.
In May 2011, every one of Metro's bus stops were replaced with new signs that reflected the rebrand.  With these stops, a feature new to Omaha was added.  At all transfer points, a special stop designated "transfer" was added, along with the route numbers that serve the transfer stop.  Prior to adding the new Metro stops, several styles of bus stop sign dotted the metro, with some dating back to the 1970s.
One month later in June 2011, Metro launched 9 new New Flyer Low Floor Restyled buses.  These were Omaha's first new non-Gillig brand transit buses since 1994.
Later in December 2011, Metro joined Google Transit.  This was an upgrade from Metro's own trip planner which has been described as cumbersome.
Early in 2012, Metro upgraded Benson Park Transit Center and Westroads Transit Center.  Signs with QR codes were added for people with smart phones to access more information.  As well concrete improvements were made.

COVID Effects on Metro Transit
On March 13, 2020, following the COVID-19 outbreak in the US, Metro Transit took an initiative to reduce the effects on low ridership, social distancing, and direct contact between drivers and transit riders. As a result, multiple routes were decreased in the number of vehicles and daily trips by almost half. The routes that remained unaffected by this were Route 2, 18, 24, and 30, as these routes experienced less than a 20% decrease in ridership. Other routes resulted in a reduction of service throughout peak, midday, and evening times.

However, after three months of reduced services, on July 14, 2020, Metro Transit announced that some routes would increase service to the standard before the COVID-19 outbreak. As a response, ridership numbers did increase, but not to the same standard pre-pandemic. Metro Transit made no further changes to service frequency until ORBT launched later the same year.

A few months following the launch of ORBT on February 1, 2021, Metro Transit took further initiatives to increase the health and safety of riders and drivers. As such, services that would serve a reduced frequency during the midday would receive additional cleaning to comply with CDC standards to disinfect busses at the end of each route. In addition, Metro Transit also installed safety shields between the driver compartment and the ticketing machine.

ORBT, Omaha Rapid Bus Transit

Launched on November 18, 2020, the ORBT line was introduced into the Metro Transit system as the first Rapid Transit Bus line in Omaha and the state of Nebraska. This service has been running along Dodge St in place of the previous route 2. With fewer stops and higher service frequency, Metro Transit increased the daily round trips on Dodge Street from 65 to 100 busses on weekdays. This change also meant that 9 out of 10 riders that traveled on Dodge Street would be within three blocks or less to an ORBT Station or stop. The stops in order can be seen below. For the first 11 months of service, ORBT remained a free service for riders traveling on Dodge Street. Still, after the announcement of UMO, a contactless payment system created by Metro Transit, ORBT stated to collect fares via UMO or through QR Code Tickets dispensed at the stations located along the route. OBRT Remains a contactless boarding service and the only service in the Metro Transit network to not accept paper tickets aside from the QR Code paper slips.

MetroNEXT
Announced by Metro Transit on February 25, 2021, MetroNEXT is a public initiative to determine what direction Metro Transit should take in developing the existing public transit network. For some time, public input was accepted, and Metro Transit made further development into the MetroNEXT initiative. As a result, in late March 2021, round one of the initiative included a rough understanding of the individual communities and landscape that may limit service expansion and frequency. Round 2, held from mid-November to early December 2021, to frame the future of the transit network. Round 3 and 4 have yet to be held as of November 2021, but it is planned to occur in early 2022. The final plan was authorized in April 2022 by the Metro board. On June 23, 2022, Metro announced a decision to transform the authority into a Regional Transit Authority to help implement the MetroNEXT Plan.

Transit Centers

Transit Centers in Omaha are an important part of Metro's system.  Since 2006, many transit centers have been built or removed.  Those removed were the Crossroads Transit Center in 2006, the Stockyards Transit Center in South Omaha which was replaced by Metro College Transit Center in 2007 and the Benson Park Transit Center in 2020.  Others added were the Westroads Transit Center near Westroads Mall.  Two other major meeting places recently upgraded to transit Center status are the Aksarben Transit Center in south central Omaha, and 76th Street Transit Center near Crossroads Mall.  Both are not currently equipped with all of the amenities typically expected with a transit center, but are planned for upgrade.  As of December 2012, Omaha's most used transit center, North Omaha Transit Center, has been rebuilt. Currently being phased out as construction nears, a new Downtown Transit Center is planned for the area.

Current Transit Centers (2022)
Aksarben Transit Center - This transit center is located at 6801 Mercy Road and consists of two shelters with benches and bike racks serving 5 routes. The center opened on January 20, 2019, replacing the former Bergan Mercy Transit Center.
North Omaha Transit Center - This transit center is located at 4308 North 30th Street and consists of 14 bus bays with a covered platform and indoor waiting area serving 10 routes.
South Omaha Transit Center - This transit center is located at 2801 Babe Gomez Boulevard and consists of 8 bus bays serving 5 routes.
Westroads Transit Center - This transit center is located at 1099 N 102nd Street and consists of 6 covered bus bays serving 5 routes.

Fixed Route Ridership

The ridership and service statistics shown here are of fixed route services only and do not include demand response. Per capita statistics are based on the Omaha urbanized area as reported in NTD data. Starting in 2011, 2010 census numbers replace the 2000 census numbers to calculate per capita statistics.

See also
 Transportation in Omaha
 List of bus transit systems in the United States

References

External links

Transportation in Omaha, Nebraska
Bus transportation in Nebraska
Bus transportation in Iowa
1972 establishments in Nebraska
Government of Omaha, Nebraska